Caerwedros was a medieval commote in the south of the Kingdom of Ceredigion. With Mebwynion, Gwynionydd and Is Coed, Caerwedros was one of three cantref Is Aeron commotes.

Caerwedros was a coastal commote, which lay on the shores of Cardigan Bay. It boarded Anhuniog commote in the north (in the Uwch Aeron cantref), Mebwynion commote to the east, and Gwynionydd and Is Coed commotes to the south.

It's possible that the cwmwd's early centre was in Llwyndafydd. It was later occupied by the Normans for a period of time and Castell Caerwedros was built here, near Llwyndafydd, by Lord Richard de Clare in 1110.

See also
Cantref
Kingdom of Ceredigion

Notes

Bibliography

Cantrefs